Xu Youfang (born December 1939) is a Chinese politician. He was a member of the 15th and 16th Central Committee of the Chinese Communist Party. He was a delegate to the 9th National People's Congress.

Biography
Xu was born in Guangde County (now Guangde), Anhui, in December 1939. In 1959, he entered Anhui Agricultural University, majoring in the Department of Forestry. 

After graduating in 1963, he was assigned as an official to Bajiazi Forestry Bureau in northeast China's Jilin province, and worked there for ten years totally. He joined the Chinese Communist Party (CCP) in April 1973. In October 1973, he was despatched to Jilin Provincial Forestry Department, where he eventually became its deputy head in April 1983. 

In January 1985, he was transferred to Beijing and appointed director of Forestry Industry Bureau of the Ministry of Forestry. He moved up the ranks to become vice minister in March 1986 and minister in March 1993.

He was appointed party secretary of Heilongjiang in July 1997, concurrently serving as chairman of Heilongjiang People's Congress since January 2003.

He was chosen as deputy head of the Central Rural Work Leading Group in April 2003, and served until July 2007.

References

1939 births
Living people
People from Guangde
Anhui Agricultural University alumni
People's Republic of China politicians from Anhui
Chinese Communist Party politicians from Anhui
Members of the 15th Central Committee of the Chinese Communist Party
Members of the 16th Central Committee of the Chinese Communist Party
Delegates to the 9th National People's Congress
CCP committee secretaries of Heilongjiang